Hermann Freiherr von Spaun (9 May 1833 – 28 May 1919) was an admiral in the Austro-Hungarian Navy. He was the Commander-in-Chief of the Austro-Hungarian Navy from December 1897 to October 1904.

Background
Born into the Swabian noble family of Spaun, Hermann was the son of Joseph von Spaun (1788-1865), an advisor in the imperial court who was elevated to baronial rank in 1859, and Franziska Roner Edle von Ehrenwert (1795-1890). He married Emma Lobmeyr on 28 April 1893 in Trieste.

Honours
The cruiser SMS Admiral Spaun was named in his honour.

Orders and decorations

Literature

References

Austro-Hungarian admirals
1833 births
1919 deaths
Grand Officers of the Order of Saints Maurice and Lazarus
Grand Cordons of the Order of the Rising Sun
Recipients of the Order of the Medjidie, 3rd class
Commanders of the Order of Christ (Portugal)
Recipients of the Order of the White Eagle (Russia)
Commanders of the Order of Isabella the Catholic
Honorary Knights Grand Cross of the Order of St Michael and St George